Carlos Calderón de la Barca Perea (2 October 1934 – 15 September 2012) was a Mexican football league forward.

Career
He played on the university team. He played for Mexico in the 1958 FIFA World Cup. He also played for Atlante.

References

External links
 
FIFA profile

1934 births
2012 deaths
Footballers from Mexico City
Association football forwards
Mexico international footballers
1958 FIFA World Cup players
Atlante F.C. footballers
Club Universidad Nacional footballers
Liga MX players
Mexican footballers